Somatina postlineata is a moth of the  family Geometridae. It is found in India.

References

Moths described in 1899
Scopulini